The men's high jump event at the 1932 Olympic Games took place July 31. It was a final only format, no heats or qualifying jumps. Fourteen athletes from 10 nations competed. The 1930 Olympic Congress in Berlin had reduced the limit from 4 athletes per NOC to 3 athletes. The event was won by Duncan McNaughton of Canada, breaking the United States' dominance over the event; McNaughton was the first non-American to win. Bob Van Osdel of the United States took silver, while Simeon Toribio earned the Philippines' first medal in any track & field athletics event.

Background

This was the ninth appearance of the event, which is one of 12 athletics events to have been held at every Summer Olympics. The returning finalists from the 1928 Games were bronze medalist Claude Ménard of France, fourth-place finisher Simeon Toribio of the Philippines, and sixth-place finisher Kazuo Kimura of Japan. American George Spitz had been the best jumper in 1932 but was suffering from an ankle injury.

Poland and Switzerland each made their debut in the event. The United States appeared for the ninth time, having competed at each edition of the Olympic men's high jump to that point.

Competition format

Due to the small number of competitors (there were fewer entrants in 1932 than there had been finalists in 1928), the competition was a direct final. Athletes had three attempts at each height.

Records

These were the standing world and Olympic records (in metres) prior to the 1932 Summer Olympics.

No new world or Olympic records were set during the competition.

Schedule

Results

Jump sequences are not known for the 1.80, 1.85, and 1.90 metres heights. Kimura's jump sequence for 1.94 metres is unknown, but he cleared that height.

There were two jump-offs. For first through fourth place, the jumpers had a jump-off that started at 6'7" (2.007 metres); none cleared that height or 1.99 metres. At 1.97 metres (where they had tied during the final itself), McNaughton cleared on the first attempt to win gold. Details of the jump-off after that are not known. A second jump-off for fifth and sixth place was held; details are not known.

References

Men's high jump
High jump at the Olympics
Men's events at the 1932 Summer Olympics